Cucumaricola is a genus of crustaceans belonging to the monotypic family Cucumaricolidae.

The species of this genus are found in Malesia.

Species:

Cucumaricola curvatus 
Cucumaricola notabilis

References

Cyclopoida